Patsy Ann "Pat" Danner (born January 13, 1934,  Louisville, Kentucky) is an American politician. She formerly represented the Missouri's 6th congressional district in the United States House of Representatives as a Democrat.

Education and background
Danner grew up in Bevier, Missouri; her maternal grandparents emigrated from Lebanon in the first decade of the 20th century. She attended public schools and graduated from Northwest Missouri State University cum laude with a BA in political science. Following graduation, Danner worked as district administrator to Congressman Jerry Litton. She was appointed to a sub-cabinet position in the Carter administration.

Political career
Congressman Litton vacated his seat to run for the United States Senate in 1976, and Danner filed in the race to replace him. Danner was defeated in the August 1976, Democratic primary by Morgan Maxfield, who was himself defeated in November by Republican state Representative Tom Coleman. In 1982, Danner was elected to the Missouri State Senate, and was re-elected in 1986 and 1990. In 1992, Danner successfully ran for Congress, defeating the incumbent Coleman in an upset. Danner was re-elected to the House in 1994, 1996, and 1998.

In 2000, Danner announced that she would not seek re-election because she was undergoing treatment for breast cancer. Her son, Steve Danner, a former state senator, filed to replace her and was defeated by Sam Graves, 51% to 47%.

See also
List of Arab and Middle-Eastern Americans in the United States Congress
Women in the United States House of Representatives

References

External links

1934 births
Living people
American politicians of Lebanese descent
Democratic Party Missouri state senators
Female members of the United States House of Representatives
Women state legislators in Missouri
People from Macon County, Missouri
Politicians from Louisville, Kentucky
Democratic Party members of the United States House of Representatives from Missouri
Kentucky women in politics
21st-century American women